Jean Nickels (30 January 1917 – 3 March 1985) was a Luxembourgian sprint canoeist who competed in the late 1940s. At the 1948 Summer Olympics in London, he finished 15th in the K-2 10000 m event while being eliminated in the heats of the K-2 1000 m event.

References
Jean Nickels' profile at Sports Reference.com

1917 births
1985 deaths
Canoeists at the 1948 Summer Olympics
Luxembourgian male canoeists
Olympic canoeists of Luxembourg